Sandåkerns IP  was a football stadium in Umeå, Sweden  and the former home stadium for the football teams Umeå IK and Umeå FC

References 

Defunct football venues in Sweden
Buildings and structures in Umeå